Salvatore "Sam" Calautti (1971/72 – July 12, 2013), was an Italian-Canadian hitman for the Calabrian-based Mafia organization 'Ndrangheta, based in Toronto and Woodbridge, Ontario, Canada. The organization rivals the Sicilian Rizzuto crime family.

Life and criminal activities

Calautti was a father of three, restaurant owner and heavy gambler, employed by the 'Ndrangheta since he was a teenager when he worked as a debt collector who was known for his short temper and "always carrying a gun".

Calautti is connected to the murders of Giovanni Costa in 1991, who was gunned down near his home in Vaughan, and Francesco Loiero in 1996, owner of Rustic Bakery in Toronto who was shot to death while sitting in his car in a Vaughan parking lot. In 1997, Calautti was accused of the murder of Giuseppe Congiusta, who was shot nine times as he got out of his car outside of a Toronto social club, but was acquitted the following spring when the jury found Calautti not guilty after a witness gave a description of the gunman that did not match him. In October 2000, Calautti was suspected for the revenge murder of Vito Rizzuto's former ally Gaetano "Guy" Panepinto, in a drive-by shooting while he drove his Cadillac in Toronto after Calautti's close associates Domenic Napoli and Antonio Oppedisano disappeared in March of that year due to conflict with Panepinto over gambling territory.

The Montreal Royal Canadian Mounted Police investigation, Project Colisée found in 2006 that Calautti ran up over $200,000 in gambling debts to the Rizzuto family and the Hells Angels. After he refused to pay, the debt was believed to be assumed by Toronto mobster Michele Modica, sparking hostilities between the Rizzuto's Toronto connection Pietro Scarcella, leading to the 2004 attempted assassination of Modica in a North York California Sandwiches shop, leaving innocent victim, Louise Russo, paralyzed. Calautti, however, was not one of the shooters in the attempted assassination.

Calautti was also investigated in the November 2010 homicide of Nicolo Rizzuto, who was shot dead by a sniper while in the kitchen of his Montreal mansion after police saw one of Calautti's longtime associates in Montreal the day after Rizzuto's death.

Death
Calautti was shot dead at the age of 41 in his BMWX6 around 1:00a.m. on July12, 2013 outside the Terrace Banquet Hall in Vaughan after attending the stag of a local bookie where up to 500people were in attendance. His associate James Tusek was also killed.

References

1970s births
2013 deaths
Canadian gangsters of Italian descent
Canadian male criminals
2013 murders in Canada
Canadian murder victims
Deaths by firearm in Ontario
Mafia hitmen
Male murder victims
Murdered Canadian gangsters
Murdered 'Ndranghetisti
'Ndranghetisti
People acquitted of murder
Unsolved murders in Canada